Flor Salvaje is an American telenovela that premiered on Telemundo on August 2, 2011, and concluded on March 2, 2012. The telenovela is produced by Hugo León Ferrer, and created by Perla Farías based on La novia oscura original by Laura Restrepo. The show is deloveped by RTI Producciones and Telemundo Studios, and distributed by Telemundo Internacional. It stars Mónica Spear as the titular character.

History
From August 2, 2011 to March 2, 2012, Telemundo aired Flor Salvaje weeknights at 9pm/8c during the 2011 season, replacing Los Herederos Del Monte. Corazón Valiente replaced this telenovela on March 6, 2012. As with most of its other telenovelas, the network broadcast English subtitles as closed captions on CC3.

Telemundo broadcast reruns of Flor Salvaje weekday mornings at 10:30am/9:30c from August 11, 2014 - January 26, 2015.

Cast

Main 
 Mónica Spear as Amanda Monteverde / Flor Salvaje
 Tony Dalton as Don Rafael Urrieta
 José Luis Reséndez as Pablo Aguilar
 Roberto Manrique as Sacramento Iglesias
 María Elisa Camargo as Catalina Larrazabal de Urrieta
 Gregorio Pernía as Mariano Azcárraga
 Geraldine Zivic as La Mina
 Norkys Batista as Zahra
 Angeline Moncayo as Correcaminos / Elena
 Indhira Serrano as Olguita
 Carolina Gaitán as Alicia
 Claudia La Gatta as Clara
 Viviana Corrales as Rocío
 Pedro Palacio as Piruetas
 Alex Gil as Enrique
 Francisco Bolívar as Dudi
 José Luis Paniagua as Don Raimundo Rojas
 Laura Torres as Susana Monteverde
 Susana Rojas as Ana Monteverde
 Sara Quintero as La Beba

Recurring 
 Jonathan Islas as Abel Torres
 Juan Pablo Raba as Emiliano Monteverde
 Gonzalo Vivanco as Francisco Losada

Awards

References

External links
 

2011 telenovelas
2011 American television series debuts
2012 American television series endings
2011 Colombian television series debuts
2012 Colombian television series endings
American television series based on telenovelas
Colombian telenovelas
RTI Producciones telenovelas
Spanish-language American telenovelas
Telemundo telenovelas